Pure is an off-road, quad-bike trick-racing video game for Xbox 360, PlayStation 3 and Microsoft Windows published by Disney Interactive Studios and developed by Black Rock Studio (formerly Climax Racing, the developers of the MotoGP and ATV Offroad Fury series). The game was announced on February 14, 2008 and was released in North America on September 16, 2008 on Windows, PlayStation 3 and Xbox 360, in Europe on September 26, 2008 and in Japan on June 25, 2009.  The game incorporates a trick system that rewards the player with speed boosts for successfully pulling off tricks.

Gameplay
Players race with quad bikes in locations across the world, pulling off incredible stunts at extreme heights. There are three different race types:

Race: Standard races over 3 laps. The tracks have plenty of turns and vertigo-inducing jumps. The player has to stay on top of the chart and keep pulling "fresh" tricks to win.
Freestyle: Perform and combo as many tricks as possible before running out of gas. In the end, the player with the highest score wins.
Sprint: Short races over 5 laps. Sprint tracks have only one or two small jumps and many hard turns, placing increased importance on turns as opposed to stunts.

The game has a trick system that monitors what kind of tricks the player has been showing off. If the player repeats the same trick, it becomes "stale", earning less points, but new tricks are "fresh" and score more points. Tricks add to a player's "thrill bar", with higher-level tricks becoming available as the bar is filled. If the bar is full, the player may perform a "special trick" given a high enough jump. The bar may deplete if boost is used or if the player crashes after an unsuccessful trick.

Development
Pure director Jason Avent assured gamers that the Xbox 360 and PlayStation 3 versions would run identically.

At E3 2008, Pure was awarded Best Racing Game of E3 2008 by the Game Critics Awards, Editors’ Choice Award from Official Xbox Magazine (U.S.), Best Driving Game from GameTrailers.com and Best Racing Game on Xbox 360 from IGN.

A demo was released on the PlayStation Network and Xbox Live Marketplace on September 4, 2008. The demo features one level of play. The PC demo was made available on October 2.

During the 2009 holiday season, Pure and Lego Batman were bundled with select Xbox 360 packages as a bonus.

Reception

Pure was well received by critics. Official Xbox Magazine gave it a 9 out of 10. GameRankings gave the game an average score of 84.0% for the PC game, 82.6% for the PlayStation 3 game, and 85.4% for the Xbox 360 game. Metacritic has an average score of 83 out of 100 for both the PC and PlayStation 3 games, and 85 out of 100 for the Xbox 360 game. Ryan Geddes from IGN gave the game an 8.4 out of a possible 10 points, praising that "The controls are intuitive, the tracks are pure eye candy and the tricks are so crazy", but noting that the game lacked depth.

References

External links
Official website

2008 video games
Disney video games
Off-road racing video games
PlayStation 3 games
Windows games
Xbox 360 games
Video games developed in the United Kingdom
Video games set in California
Sports video games set in Italy
Video games set in New Mexico
Video games set in New Zealand
Video games set in Thailand
Video games set in Wyoming